Waidring is a municipality in the Kitzbühel district in the Austrian state of Tyrol located 20 km northeast of Kitzbühel and 9 km east of Kirchdorf in Tirol near the border with Salzburg. The village was mentioned for the first time as „Waitheringen“ in documents from 1147.

References

External links

Chiemgau Alps
Cities and towns in Kitzbühel District